Federica Testa (born 27 August 1993) is an Italian-born former competitive ice dancer who is best known for her partnership with Lukáš Csölley for Slovakia. Together, they won four ISU Challenger Series medals and three Slovak national titles. They achieved their best ISU Championship result, 8th, at the 2015 and 2016 European Championships.

Testa competed with Christopher Mior and Andrea Malnati for Italy until 2011.

Personal life
Federica Testa was born on 27 August 1993 in Milan, Italy. She became a Slovak citizen in autumn 2013.

Early career
Testa skated in singles for two years, stopped skating for a year, and then took up ice dancing. She competed with Andrea Malnati for seven years, representing Italy. Testa/Malnati were the 2009 Italian junior silver medalists.

In the spring of 2009, Testa teamed up with Canadian Christopher Mior, continuing to represent Italy. The duo competed at the senior level and became the 2011 Italian national champions. Following their split, Testa skated briefly with a Finnish skater.

Partnership with Csölley
In October 2011, it was announced that Testa would compete with Lukáš Csölley for Slovakia. Testa/Csölley made their international debut at the Bavarian Open in February 2012 and then competed at the World Championships in March in Nice, France. The following season, they finished 17th at the 2013 European Championships in Zagreb, Croatia, having placed 19th in the short dance and 16th in the free dance. At the 2013 World Championships in London, Ontario, Canada, the two placed 26th in the short dance and did not advance further.

In September 2013, Testa/Csölley competed at the final Olympic qualifying event, the Nebelhorn Trophy; they finished ninth and became the first alternates for the 2014 Winter Olympics. In January 2014, they placed 12th at the European Championships in Budapest, Hungary but the two missed the cut-off for the free dance in March at the World Championships in Saitama, Japan.

Testa/Csölley began the 2014–15 season with a bronze medal at the 2014 Ondrej Nepela Trophy, an ISU Challenger Series (CS) event held in early October. Later that month, making their Grand Prix debut, they placed fourth in the short dance and seventh overall at the 2014 Skate America. In November, they were awarded gold at two CS competitions, the Volvo Open Cup and Warsaw Cup. They finished eighth overall at the 2015 European Championships in Stockholm, Sweden. In March, they placed 15th at the 2015 World Championships in Shanghai, having ranked 13th in the short and 15th in the free.

Testa/Csölley finished 8th (9th SD, 8th FD) at the 2016 European Championships in Bratislava. At the 2016 World Championships in Boston, they placed 12th in the short dance, 15th in the free, and 14th overall.

Testa/Csölley received invitations to the 2016 Skate Canada International and 2016 Trophée de France but withdrew from both Grand Prix events on 7 July 2016 due to Testa's decision to retire from competition.

Programs 
(with Csölley)

Competitive highlights 
GP: Grand Prix; CS: Challenger Series

With Csölley for Slovakia

With Mior for Italy

With Malnati for Italy

References

External links 

 
 

1993 births
Living people
Figure skaters from Milan
Italian female ice dancers
Slovak female ice dancers
Naturalized citizens of Slovakia
Universiade medalists in figure skating
Universiade bronze medalists for Slovakia
Competitors at the 2015 Winter Universiade
Competitors at the 2013 Winter Universiade
Naturalised sports competitors